Thomas Tien Ken-sin, SVD (October 24, 1890 – July 24, 1967) was a Chinese Cardinal of the Catholic Church and chair of Fu Jen Catholic University. He served as Archbishop of Peking from 1946 until his death, and was elevated to the cardinalate in 1946 by Pope Pius XII.

Biography
Thomas Tien Ken-sin was born in Chantsui, Yanggu, (Shantung province) to Kilian Tien Ken-sin and his wife Maria Yang. Baptized in 1901, he studied at the seminary in Yenchowfu before being ordained to the priesthood by Bishop Augustin Henninghaus on June 9, 1918. Tien then did pastoral work in the Yangku Mission until 1939. He entered the Society of the Divine Word on March 8, 1929, in the Netherlands, taking his first vows on February 2, 1931, and his final ones on March 7, 1935. He was raised to Apostolic Prefect of Yangku on February 2, 1934.

On July 11, 1939, Tien was appointed Apostolic Vicar of Yangku and Titular Bishop of Ruspae. He received his episcopal consecration on the following October 29 from Pope Pius XII himself, with Archbishops Celso Constantini and Henri Streicher, MAfr, serving as co-consecrators. Tien was later made Apostolic Vicar of Qingdao on November 10, 1942.

He was elevated to Cardinal Priest of Santa Maria in Via by Pope Pius XII in the consistory of February 18, 1946. Tien, the first cardinal from China, was then named, on April 11 of that same year, the first Archbishop of Beijing in post-Yuan Dynasty China. In 1951 he was exiled from China by the Communist regime, and spent this time in Illinois in the United States, to where he came that year for treatment of a heart ailment. He was one of the cardinal electors who participated in the 1958 papal conclave which selected Pope John XXIII, and was Apostolic Administrator of Taipei from December 16, 1959 to 1966. From 1962 to 1965, he attended the Second Vatican Council, and voted in the 1963 papal conclave, which selected Pope Paul VI.

Tien died in Taipei on July 24, 1967, at age 76. He is buried in the metropolitan cathedral of that same city.

Influence
He greatly promoted devotion to Our Lady of China.
Tien was the first Cardinal also from the Society of the Divine Word.
The Holy See has not recognized any of CPA-approved successors of Tien as Archbishop of Peking, though in his 2007 letter to the faithful in China, Pope Benedict XVI expressed an openness to dialogue with the CPA-appointed "bishops".

References

External links
 SVD Hagiography 
Cardinals of the Holy Roman Church
Catholic-Hierarchy
Tien's Appointment to Taipei

Cardinals created by Pope Pius XII
1890 births
1967 deaths
20th-century Roman Catholic archbishops in China
Apostolic prefects
Chinese cardinals
Taiwanese Roman Catholic priests
Participants in the Second Vatican Council
Divine Word Missionaries Order
Taiwanese people from Shandong
Chinese Roman Catholic archbishops